The 2007 season is the 16th competitive football season in Estonia.

National Leagues

Meistriliiga

Esiliiga

Estonian FA Cup

National Teams

A Team

The Estonia national football team played a total number of fifteen matches (including one unofficial) and did not qualify for Euro 2008 in Austria and Switzerland.

U-21

U-19

U-18

U-17

U-16

U-15

References

External links
 Estonian Football Association

 
Seasons in Estonian football